{{Infobox river
 | name              = Varatella
 | image             = Torrente_varatella.png
 | image_caption     =
 | length            = <ref name=provsv>PIANO DI BACINO STRALCIO SUL RISCHIO IDROGEOLOGICO, Provincia di Savona, on-line in pdf:   (access: 2015-10-09)</ref>
 | source1_elevation = 
 | mouth_elevation   = 
 | discharge1_avg    = 
 | basin_size        = 
 | source1_location  = Ligurian Alps
 | mouth             = Ligurian Sea
 | mouth_location    = Borghetto Santo Spirito (SV)
 | mouth_coordinates = 
 | subdivision_type1 = Country
 | subdivision_name1 = Italy
 | map               = Varatella map.png
}}

The Varatella (or Varatello) is a  stream of Liguria (Italy).

 Geography 

The river is formed at  elevation by the confluence of two streams, Rio della Valle and Rio di Carpe, in the comune of Toirano.  The river then flows through the Valle Varatella and crosses the centre of Toirano, where it receives from right the waters of rio Barescione, its main tributary. Heading south-east the Varatella reaches Borghetto Santo Spirito and ends its course in the Ligurian Sea, after being crossed by Autostrada A10, Genoa–Ventimiglia railway and Aurelia national road.

Varatella basin is totally included in the Province of Savona.

Main tributaries

 Left hand:
 Rio della valle
 Rio delle Banchette
 Right hand:
 Rio di Carpe
 Rio Barescione
 Rio di Riva

See also

 List of rivers of Italy

References

 External links 

  Torrente Varatella'' www.fiumi.com (fishing rules for the stream)

Rivers of Italy
Rivers of Liguria
Rivers of the Province of Savona
Rivers of the Alps
Drainage basins of the Ligurian Sea